Salmon Arm was the name of a provincial electoral district in the Canadian province of British Columbia including on the town of Salmon Arm on Shuswap Lake. The riding first appeared in the 1924 election. After the 1966 election there was a redistribution with the resulting riding in the same area being Shuswap.

For other current and historical federal and provincial ridings in the area of Kamloops, British Columbia see Kamloops (provincial electoral district) and Kamloops (electoral district); for those in the Okanagan please see Okanagan (electoral districts).

Demographics

Political geography

Notable elections

Notable MLAs

Electoral history 
Note:  Winners in each election are in bold.	

|Liberal
|Francis Edward Wilcox
|align="right"|754 	
|align="right"|30.18%
|align="right"|
|align="right"|unknown
|- bgcolor="white"
!align="right" colspan=3|Total valid votes
!align="right"| 2,498
!align="right"|100.00%
!align="right"|
|- bgcolor="white"
!align="right" colspan=3|Total rejected ballots
!align="right"|
!align="right"|
!align="right"|
|- bgcolor="white"
!align="right" colspan=3|Turnout
!align="right"|%
!align="right"|
!align="right"|
|}  	  	  	

|Liberal
|James Smart
|align="right"|623 	 	
|align="right"|26.75%
|align="right"|
|align="right"|unknown
|- bgcolor="white"
!align="right" colspan=3|Total valid votes
!align="right"|2,329 	
!align="right"|100.00%
!align="right"|
|- bgcolor="white"
!align="right" colspan=3|Total rejected ballots
!align="right"|24
!align="right"|
!align="right"|
|- bgcolor="white"
!align="right" colspan=3|Turnout
!align="right"|%
!align="right"|
!align="right"|
|}

|Liberal
|James Reginald Colley
|align="right"|888 		
|align="right"|29.46%
|align="right"|
|align="right"|unknown

|Co-operative Commonwealth Fed.
|George Faulds Stirling
|align="right"|603 	 	
|align="right"|20.01%
|align="right"|
|align="right"|unknown
|- bgcolor="white"
!align="right" colspan=3|Total valid votes
!align="right"|3,014 	
!align="right"|100.00%
!align="right"|
|- bgcolor="white"
!align="right" colspan=3|Total rejected ballots
!align="right"|20
!align="right"|
!align="right"|
|- bgcolor="white"
!align="right" colspan=3|Turnout
!align="right"|%
!align="right"|
!align="right"|
|}

|Liberal
|Harold Willett Birch
|align="right"|884 	 	
|align="right"|27.87%
|align="right"|
|align="right"|unknown

|Independent
|Rolf Wallgren Bruhn 1
|align="right"|1,533
|align="right"|48.33%
|align="right"|
|align="right"|unknown

|Co-operative Commonwealth Fed.
|Robert Wood
|align="right"|755 			
|align="right"|23.80%
|align="right"|
|align="right"|unknown
|- bgcolor="white"
!align="right" colspan=3|Total valid votes
!align="right"|3,172 	
!align="right"|100.00%
!align="right"|
|- bgcolor="white"
!align="right" colspan=3|Total rejected ballots
!align="right"|71
!align="right"|
!align="right"|
|- bgcolor="white"
!align="right" colspan=3|Turnout
!align="right"|%
!align="right"|
!align="right"|
|- bgcolor="white"
!align="right" colspan=7|1  <small>Supported and endorsed by the B.C. Constructives.
|}

|Liberal
|Arthur Fancett Barton
|align="right"|468 	 			
|align="right"|18.06%
|align="right"|
|align="right"|unknown

|Co-operative Commonwealth Fed.
|John William Tordoff
|align="right"|563 	 		 		
|align="right"|21.72%
|align="right"|
|align="right"|unknown
|- bgcolor="white"
!align="right" colspan=3|Total valid votes
!align="right"|2,592 		
!align="right"|100.00%
!align="right"|
|- bgcolor="white"
!align="right" colspan=3|Total rejected ballots
!align="right"|52
!align="right"|
!align="right"|
|- bgcolor="white"
!align="right" colspan=3|Turnout
!align="right"|%
!align="right"|
!align="right"|
|}

|Co-operative Commonwealth Fed.
|George Faulds Stirling
|align="right"|1,040 	
|align="right"|40.00%
|align="right"|
|align="right"|unknown
|- bgcolor="white"
!align="right" colspan=3|Total valid votes
!align="right"|2,600
!align="right"|100.00%
!align="right"|
|- bgcolor="white"
!align="right" colspan=3|Total rejected ballots
!align="right"|28
!align="right"|
!align="right"|
|- bgcolor="white"
!align="right" colspan=3|Turnout
!align="right"|%
!align="right"|
!align="right"|
|}	

|Co-operative Commonwealth Fed.
|Russell Carleton Freeze
|align="right"|1,681 	 		
|align="right"|39.93%
|align="right"|
|align="right"|unknown

|- bgcolor="white"
!align="right" colspan=3|Total valid votes
!align="right"|4,210
!align="right"|100.00%
!align="right"|
|- bgcolor="white"
!align="right" colspan=3|Total rejected ballots
!align="right"|86
!align="right"|
!align="right"|
|- bgcolor="white"
!align="right" colspan=3|Turnout
!align="right"|%
!align="right"|
!align="right"|
|}	

|Liberal
|John James Carmichael
|align="right"|669              	
|align="right"|15.69%
|align="right"| -
|align="right"| -.- %
|align="right"|
|align="right"|unknown

|B.C. Social Credit League
|James Allan Reid
|align="right"|1,462
|align="right"|34.30%
|align="right"|1,979
|align="right"|55.03%
|align="right"|
|align="right"|unknown

|Conservative
|Arthur Brown Ritchie
|align="right"|896           	
|align="right"|21.02%
|align="right"| -
|align="right"| - %
|align="right"|
|align="right"|unknown

|Co-operative Commonwealth Fed.
|William John Thompson
|align="right"|1,236                      	
|align="right"|28.99%
|align="right"|1,617
|align="right"|44.97%
|align="right"|
|align="right"|unknown
|- bgcolor="white"
!align="right" colspan=3|Total valid votes
!align="right"|4,263
!align="right"|100.00%
!align="right"|3,596  	
!align="right"| - %
!align="right"|
|- bgcolor="white"
!align="right" colspan=3|Total rejected ballots
!align="right"|164
!align="right"|
!align="right"|
!align="right"|
!align="right"|
|- bgcolor="white"
!align="right" colspan=3|Turnout
!align="right"|%
!align="right"|
!align="right"|
|- bgcolor="white"
!align="right" colspan=7|2  Preferential ballot.  First and final counts of three (3) shown only.
|}  	  	

|Liberal
|John James Carmichael
|align="right"|623 	 		 		
|align="right"|14.52%
|align="right"| -
|align="right"| -.- %
|align="right"|
|align="right"|unknown

|Conservative
|Arthur Brown Ritchie
|align="right"|600 	 	          	
|align="right"|13.98%
|align="right"| -
|align="right"| - %
|align="right"|
|align="right"|unknown

|Co-operative Commonwealth Fed.
|William John Thompson
|align="right"|1,341 	 	 	 	 	 	 	 	 	
|align="right"|31.24%
|align="right"|1,806    		
|align="right"|47.29%
|align="right"|
|align="right"|unknown

|- bgcolor="white"
!align="right" colspan=3|Total valid votes
!align="right"|4,292 	  		    	  		
!align="right"|100.00%
!align="right"|3,819   	
!align="right"| - %
!align="right"|
|- bgcolor="white"
!align="right" colspan=3|Total rejected ballots
!align="right"|167
!align="right"|
!align="right"|
!align="right"|
!align="right"|
|- bgcolor="white"
!align="right" colspan=3|Turnout
!align="right"|%
!align="right"|
!align="right"|
|- bgcolor="white"
!align="right" colspan=7|3  Preferential ballot.  First and final counts of four (4) shown only.
|}

|Liberal
|Greta Dagma Abbing de Vries
|align="right"|339 			 	
|align="right"|8.15%
|align="right"|
|align="right"|unknown

|Co-operative Commonwealth Fed.
|William John Thompson
|align="right"|1,454 	 	
|align="right"|34.96%
|align="right"|
|align="right"|unknown

|Progressive Conservative
|Dennis Allen Williams
|align="right"|235 			 	 	
|align="right"|5.65%
|align="right"|
|align="right"|unknown
|- bgcolor="white"
!align="right" colspan=3|Total valid votes
!align="right"|4,159
!align="right"|100.00%
!align="right"|
|- bgcolor="white"
!align="right" colspan=3|Total rejected ballots
!align="right"|79
!align="right"|
!align="right"|
|- bgcolor="white"
!align="right" colspan=3|Turnout
!align="right"|%
!align="right"|
!align="right"|
|}

|Co-operative Commonwealth Fed.
|Kenneth Carr Haines
|align="right"|1,667 	
|align="right"|35.17%
|align="right"|
|align="right"|unknown

|Progressive Conservative
|Torquil (Torque) MacLeod
|align="right"|613 	 	
|align="right"|12.93%
|align="right"|
|align="right"|unknown

|Liberal
|Donald Edmund Nunn
|align="right"|481 	 	
|align="right"|10.15%
|align="right"|
|align="right"|unknown
|- bgcolor="white"
!align="right" colspan=3|Total valid votes
!align="right"|4,740
!align="right"|100.00%
!align="right"|
|- bgcolor="white"
!align="right" colspan=3|Total rejected ballots
!align="right"|59
!align="right"|
!align="right"|
|- bgcolor="white"
!align="right" colspan=3|Turnout
!align="right"|%
!align="right"|
!align="right"|
|}

|Progressive Conservative
|James Churchill
|align="right"|1,005 	 		
|align="right"|20.29%
|align="right"|
|align="right"|unknown

|Liberal
|Byron O.S. Johnson
|align="right"|245 	 		
|align="right"|4.95%
|align="right"|
|align="right"|unknown

|- bgcolor="white"
!align="right" colspan=3|Total valid votes
!align="right"|4,953
!align="right"|100.00%
!align="right"|
|- bgcolor="white"
!align="right" colspan=3|Total rejected ballots
!align="right"|57
!align="right"|
!align="right"|
|- bgcolor="white"
!align="right" colspan=3|Turnout
!align="right"|%
!align="right"|
!align="right"|
|}	  	

A redistribution took place before the 1966 election, after which the Shuswap Lake area became represented by the renamed riding of Shuswap.

Sources 

Elections BC Historical Returns

Former provincial electoral districts of British Columbia
Salmon Arm